Gorshki is a rural locality (a village) and the administrative center of Zabolotskoye Rural Settlement, Permsky District, Perm Krai, Russia. The population was 748 as of 2010. There are 30 streets.

Geography 
Gorshki is located 41 km southwest of Perm (the district's administrative centre) by road. Rastyagayevo is the nearest rural locality.

References 

Rural localities in Permsky District